Nancy Allen is an American actress who began her career in the 1970s. She made her feature film debut in a minor role opposite Jack Nicholson in The Last Detail (1973), before being cast as Chris Hargensen in Brian De Palma's film adaptation of Carrie (1976). She subsequently had a starring role in Robert Zemeckis's comedy I Wanna Hold Your Hand (1978), followed by a supporting part in Steven Spielberg's 1941 (1979).

Allen went on to collaborate with De Palma on several other films in the 1980s, including Home Movies (1980), the erotic thriller Dressed to Kill (also 1980; for which she was nominated for a Golden Globe Award), and the neo-noir Blow Out (1981). In 1984, Allen appeared in the science fiction film The Philadelphia Experiment, and later had a starring role in Abel Ferrara's The Gladiator (1986). Allen was subsequently cast by director Paul Verhoeven in the science fiction thriller RoboCop (1987) as Officer Anne Lewis, a role she reprised in the first and second sequels.

Through the 1990s, Allen appeared in several independent films and television productions, including a lead role in the French drama The Patriots (1994), directed by Éric Rochant, and a supporting role in Steven Soderbergh's crime comedy Out of Sight (1998).  As a result of this performance, the following year, she appeared in the crime film Kiss Toledo Goodbye, as well as the direct-to-video horror sequel Children of the Corn 666: Isaac's Return. She subsequently had guest-starring roles on the television series The Division and Law & Order: Special Victims Unit in 2002 and 2003, respectively.

Film

Television

Stage

References

Sources

Actress filmographies
American filmographies